The Socialist Party (PS) is a French centre-left and social-democratic political party. It holds pro-European views.
The PS was for decades the largest party of the "French Left" and used to be one of the two major political parties in the French Fifth Republic, along with The Republicans. It replaced the earlier French Section of the Workers' International in 1969 and is currently led by First Secretary Olivier Faure. The PS is a member of the Party of European Socialists, Progressive Alliance and Socialist International.

The PS first won power in 1981, when its candidate François Mitterrand was elected president of France in the 1981 presidential election. Under Mitterrand, the party achieved a governing majority in the National Assembly from 1981 to 1986 and again from 1988 to 1993. PS leader Lionel Jospin lost his bid to succeed Mitterrand as president in the 1995 presidential election against Rally for the Republic leader Jacques Chirac, but he became prime minister in a cohabitation government after the 1997 legislative election, a position Jospin held until 2002, when he was again defeated in the 2002 presidential election.

Ségolène Royal, the party's candidate for the 2007 presidential election, was defeated by conservative UMP candidate Nicolas Sarkozy. The PS won most of regional and local elections and for the first time in more than fifty years it won control of the Senate in the 2011 Senate election. On 6 May 2012, François Hollande, the first secretary of the party from 1997 to 2008, was elected president and the next month the party won a majority in the 2012 legislative election. During his term, Hollande battled with high unemployment, multiple Jihadi terrorist attacks, poor opinion ratings and a splinter group of left-wing Socialist MPs known as frondeurs (rebels). On 1 December 2016, Hollande declined to seek re-election and the PS subsequently organized a presidential primary. Left-wing Benoit Hamon was designated as the Socialist candidate after defeating former Prime Minister Manuel Valls. Facing the emergence of centrist Emmanuel Macron and left-winger Jean-Luc Mélenchon, Hamon failed to re-establish the PS leadership on the centre-left and finished 5th in the 2017 presidential election, gathering only 6.36 percent of the votes. The party then lost the majority of its MPs in the 2017 legislative election, securing just 26 seats, becoming the fourth-biggest group in the National Assembly.

Several figures who acted at the international level have also been members of the PS, including Jacques Delors, who was the president of the European Commission from 1985 to 1994 and the first person to serve three terms in that office; Dominique Strauss-Kahn, who was the managing director of the International Monetary Fund from 2007 to 2011; and Pascal Lamy, who was Director-General of the World Trade Organization from 2005 to 2013. Party membership has declined precipitously, standing at 22,000 members in 2021, down from 42,300 in 2016, 60,000 in 2014 and 173,486 members in 2012. However, before the start of the 2023 Marseille Congress, the party announced that it had more than 41,000 members, almost double that of the previous count announced during the 2021 Villeurbanne Congress.

History

French socialist movement and the SFIO 

The defeat of the Paris Commune (1871) greatly reduced the power and influence of the socialist movements in France. Its leaders were killed or exiled. France's first socialist party, the Federation of the Socialist Workers of France (FTSF), was founded in 1879. It was characterised as "possibilist" because it promoted gradual reforms. Two parties split off from it: in 1882, the French Workers' Party (POF) of Jules Guesde and Paul Lafargue (the son-in-law of Karl Marx), then in 1890 the Revolutionary Socialist Workers' Party (POSR) of Jean Allemane. At the same time, the heirs of Louis Auguste Blanqui, a symbol of the French revolutionary tradition, created the Central Revolutionary Committee (CRC) led by Édouard Vaillant. There were also some declared socialist deputies such as Alexandre Millerand and Jean Jaurès who did not belong to any party.

In 1899, the participation of Millerand in Pierre Waldeck-Rousseau's cabinet caused a debate about socialist participation in a "bourgeois government". Three years later, Jaurès, Allemane and the possibilists founded the possibilist French Socialist Party, which supported participation in government, while Guesde and Vaillant formed the Socialist Party of France, which opposed such co-operation. In 1905, during the Globe Congress, the two groups merged in the French Section of the Workers International (SFIO). Leader of the parliamentary group and director of the party paper L'Humanité, Jaurès was its most influential figure.

The party was hemmed in between the middle-class liberals of the Radical Party and the revolutionary syndicalists who dominated the trade unions. Furthermore, the goal to rally all the Socialists in one single party was partially reached: some elects refused to join the SFIO and created the Republican-Socialist Party, which supported socialist participation in liberal governments. Together with the Radicals, who wished to install laicism, the SFIO was a component of the Left Block (Bloc des gauches) without to sit in the government. In 1906, the General Confederation of Labour trade union claimed its independence from all political parties.

The French socialists were strongly anti-war, but following the assassination of Jaurès in 1914 they were unable to resist the wave of militarism which followed the outbreak of World War I. They suffered a severe split over participation in the wartime government of national unity. In 1919 the anti-war socialists were heavily defeated in elections. In 1920, during the Tours Congress, the majority and left wing of the party broke away and formed the French Section of the Communist International (SFIC) to join the Third International founded by Vladimir Lenin. The right wing, led by Léon Blum, kept the "old house" and remained in the SFIO.

In 1924 and in 1932, the Socialists joined with the Radicals in the Coalition of the Left (Cartel des Gauches), but refused to join the non-Socialist governments led by the Radicals Édouard Herriot and Édouard Daladier. These governments failed because the Socialists and the Radicals could not agree on economic policy, and also because the Communists, following the policy laid down by the Soviet Union, refused to support governments presiding over capitalist economies. The question of the possibility of a government participation with Radicals caused the split of "neosocialists" at the beginning of the 1930s. They merged with the Republican-Socialist Party in the Socialist Republican Union.

In 1934, the Communists changed their line, and the four left-wing parties came together in the Popular Front, which won the 1936 elections and brought Blum to power as France's first SFIO Prime Minister. Indeed, for the first time in its history, the SFIO obtained more votes and seats than the Radical Party and it formed the central axis of a left-wing parliamentary majority. Within a year, however, his government collapsed over economic policy and also over the issue of the Spanish Civil War. The fall of the Popular Front caused a new split from the SFIO, with the departure of the left wing of the party, led by Marceau Pivert, to the Workers and Peasants' Socialist Party. The demoralised Left fell apart and was unable to resist the collapse of the French Third Republic after the military defeat of 1940.

After the liberation of France in 1944, the SFIO re-emerged in a coalition with a powerful French Communist Party (PCF), which became the largest left-wing party, and the Christian democratic Popular Republican Movement (MRP). This alliance installed the main elements of the French welfare state and the French Fourth Republic, but it did not survive the Cold War. In May 1947, the Socialist Prime Minister Paul Ramadier dismissed the Communist ministers. Blum proposed the construction of a Third Force with the centre-left and the centre-right, against the Gaullists and the Communists. However, his candidate to lead of the SFIO, Daniel Mayer, was defeated by Guy Mollet.

Mollet was supported by the left wing of the party. Paradoxically, he spoke a Marxist language without questioning the alliance with the centre and the centre-right. His leadership was shaken when the party divided in 1954 about the European Defence Community (the half of the SFIO parliamentary group voted "no", against the instructions of the party lead, participating to the failure of the project). But later, Mollet got involved the SFIO in the build of a centre-left coalition, the Republican Front, which won a plurality in the 1956 elections. Consequently, he was Prime Minister at the head of a minority government. But the party was in decline, as were the Radicals, and the left never came close to forming a united front. Indeed, this led Mollet to assert, "the Communist Party is not on the left, but in the East". The repressive policy of Mollet in the Algerian War and his support for Charles de Gaulle's come-back in 1958 (the party lead called to vote "yes" in referendum on Fifth Republic's constitution) caused a split and the foundation of the dissident Unified Socialist Party (PSU). The SFIO returned to opposition in 1959. Discredited by its fluctuating policy during the Fourth Republic, it reached its lowest ebb in the 1960s.

Both because of its opposition to the principle of presidential election by universal suffrage and because De Gaulle's re-election appeared inevitable, the SFIO did not nominate a candidate for the 1965 presidential election. Consequently, it supported the candidacy of François Mitterrand, a former minister of the Fourth Republic who had been a conservative, then a leftist independent. He was resolutely anti-Gaullist. Supported by all the left-wing parties, he obtained a good result and faced De Gaulle in an unexpected second ballot, becoming the leader of the non-Communist left.

In order to exist between the Communist Party, leading the left, and the Gaullist Party, leading the country, the SFIO, Radicals, and left-wing republican groups created the Federation of the Democratic and Socialist Left under Mitterrand's leadership. But unable to benefit from the May 1968 events, it imploded after its disastrous defeat at the June 1968 legislative elections. One year later, the SFIO candidate Gaston Defferre was eliminated in the first round of the 1969 presidential election, with only 5% of votes.

Foundation of the PS and the Union of the Left (1969–1981) 
In 1969, during the Alfortville Congress, the SFIO was replaced by the Socialist Party (Parti socialiste or PS). It was joined by pro-Pierre Mendès-France clubs (Union of Clubs for the Renewal of the Left led by Alain Savary) and left-wing republican groups (Union of Socialist Groups and Clubs of Jean Poperen). During the Issy-les-Moulineaux Congress, Alain Savary was elected First Secretary with the support of his predecessor Guy Mollet. He proposed an "ideological dialogue" with the Communists.

Two years later, during the Epinay Congress, pro-François Mitterrand clubs (Convention of Republican Institutions), joined the party. Mitterrand defeated the Savary-Mollet duo by proposing an electoral programme with the Communists and took the lead. A new emblem, the fist and rose, was adopted to signal change in 1971. In 1972, the Common Programme was signed with the PCF and Radical Party of the Left. During the Socialist International conference, he explained the alliance of left-wing parties is a yearning of French left-wing voters. In this, the goal of his strategy was "to regain 3 million of the 5 million of PCF voters". The left, and notably the Socialist Party, experienced an electoral recovery at the 1973 legislative election. Mitterrand, the candidate of the left-wing alliance, came close to winning the 1974 presidential election. Indeed, he obtained 49.2% of votes in the second round.

At the end of 1974, some PSU members, including leader Michel Rocard, re-joined the PS. They represented the "left-wing Christian" and non-Marxist group. The most conservative members of the PS, they advocated an alignment of French socialism along the lines of European social democracy, that is, a clear acceptance of the market economy. While the "Union of the Left" triumphed at the 1977 municipal election, the electoral rise of the PS worried the Communist Party. The two parties failed to update the Common Programme and the PCF leader Georges Marchais denounced a "turn towards the Right" of the PS.

In spite of positive polls, the "Union of the Left" lost the 1978 legislative election. For the first time since 1936, the Socialists scored better in the polls than the Communists, becoming the main left-wing party, but their defeat caused an internal crisis. Mitterrand's leadership was challenged by Rocard, who wanted to abandon the Common Programme which he considered archaic and unrealistic. Mitterrand felt that the left could not win without the alliance between the Socialists and the Communists. In 1979, Mitterrand won the Metz Congress, then, despite Rocard's popularity, was chosen as PS candidate for the 1981 presidential election.

Three major tendencies or factions emerged within the PS by the end of the Seventies. One was represented by the Mitterrandists who wanted reform but not a complete break with capitalism. A second faction was led by Michel Rocard and his supporters, who sought social democracy with a strong measure of autogestion, while a third faction formed around Jean-Pierre Chevènement and the CERES group which stood for revolutionary socialism.

Mitterrand's presidency and the exercise of power (1981–1995) 
In 1981 Mitterrand defeated the incumbent conservative, Valéry Giscard d'Estaing, to become the first socialist of the Fifth Republic to be elected President of France by universal suffrage. He dissolved the National Assembly and, for the first time in their history, the French Socialists won an absolute majority of the seats. This landslide victory for the Socialists took place to the detriment of the right-wing parliamentary parties (Rally for the Republic and Union for French Democracy), as well as the Communist Party.

Mitterrand attempted to carry out socialist-inspired reforms (the 110 Propositions), furthering the dirigiste economic planning trends of the preceding conservative governments. The Prime Minister Pierre Mauroy nationalised the banks, the insurance industry and the defence industries, in accordance with the 1972 Common Program. Workers' wages were increased and working hours reduced to 39, and many other sweeping reforms carried out, but the economic crisis continued. Reforms included the abolition of death penalty, creation of a solidarity tax on wealth (ISF), introduction of proportional representation in legislative elections (which was applied only at the 1986 election), decentralization of the state (1982–83 laws), repeal of price liberalization for books (Lang Law of 1981), etc.

As early as 1982, Mitterrand faced a clear choice between maintaining France's membership in the European Monetary System, and thus the country's commitment to European integration, and pursuing his socialist reforms. He chose the former, starting the Socialist Party's acceptance of the private market economy. In 1984 Mitterrand and his second Prime Minister, Laurent Fabius, clearly abandoned any further socialist measures. The "Union of the Left" died and the Communist ministers resigned. Although there were two periods of mild economic reflation (first from 1984 to 1986 and again from 1988 to 1990), monetary and fiscal restraint was the essential policy orientation of the Mitterrand presidency from 1983 onwards.

The PS lost its majority in the French National Assembly in 1986, forcing Mitterrand to "cohabit" with the conservative government of Jacques Chirac. Nevertheless, Mitterrand was re-elected President in 1988 with a moderate programme entitled "United France". He proposed neither nationalisations nor privatisations. He chose as Prime Minister the most popular and moderate of the Socialist politicians, Michel Rocard. His cabinet included four centre-right ministers but it was supported by only a plurality in the National Assembly elected in June 1988.

During his second term, Mitterrand focused on foreign policy and European integration. He convened a referendum for the ratification of the Maastricht Treaty. He left domestic policy to his prime ministers: Michel Rocard, Édith Cresson and Pierre Bérégovoy. The party was hit by scandals about its financing and weakened by the struggle between the heirs of "Mitterrandism".

In 1990, during the Rennes Congress, the "Mitterrandist group" split between the supporters of Laurent Fabius and the friends of Lionel Jospin. Furthermore, a part of the left wing of the party, led by Jean-Pierre Chevènement split off due to his opposition to the Gulf War and the Maastricht Treaty. This section created the Citizen and Republican Movement (MDC). Finally, many on the left were disappointed by the results of the Socialist governments. At the 1993 legislative election, the PS did poorly, returning to the levels of the SFIO in the 1960s. The Socialist group of the National Assembly numbered 53 deputies against 260 during the previous term.

Rocard became First Secretary of the party, and was considered the "natural candidate" for the next presidential election. He called for a political "big bang", an agreement with the centre and the centre-right, but his efforts were in vain. One year later, his party obtained only 14% of votes at the 1994 European Parliament election. He was overthrown by a motley coalition led by Henri Emmanuelli, a "Mitterrandist" left-winger. One year before the 1995 presidential election, the PS was affected by a leadership crisis. Rocard lost the most part of his followers after his 1994 electoral crash, Fabius was weakened by the infected blood scandal, the presidentiability of Emannuelli was questioned. The hope of some party members transferred to Jacques Delors, president of the European Commission and a favourite according to the polls, but he declined due to the radicalisation of the party which prevented his centrist strategy. Finally, Lionel Jospin, who had announced his political retirement after the loss of his parliamentary seat in 1993, came back and proposed to "take stock" of Mitterrand's inheritance. For the first time, the party members were called to nominate their candidate for presidency. Benefiting from a good image in the polls, a strong loyalty to the party (as former First Secretary) and governmental experience (as former Education Minister, and the teachers were numerous and influential in the PS), he defeated Emmanuelli in the internal ballot. Then, he was defeated by Jacques Chirac in the run-off election but, given the PS crisis, his result was judged good and he returned as First Secretary.

Jospin and the Plural Left (1995–2002) 
In the legislature, the PS reconstructed a coalition with other left-wing parties: the French Communist Party, the Greens, the Radical Party of the Left, and the MDC. This "Plural Left" won the 1997 legislative election and Jospin became Prime Minister of the third "cohabitation".

His policy was broadly progressive. The Aubry laws reduced the working time to 35 hours a week, while Universal medical insurance was instituted. However, the policy of privatisation was pursued.

His coalition dissolved when the MDC leader Jean-Pierre Chevènement resigned from the Cabinet. The Green and Communist allies were weakened by their governmental participation.

The 2002 presidential election was focused on the theme of insecurity. Jospin, again the Socialists' candidate, was eliminated in the first round due to there being too many left-wing candidates who split the vote. He announced his retirement from politics, and the PS called on its supporters to vote for Chirac in order to defeat the far-right National Front leader Jean-Marie Le Pen, who had surprisingly advanced to the run-off. Two months later, the "Plural Left" lost the 2002 legislative election.

After the 2002 shock 
François Hollande, who became First Secretary in 1997, was re-elected in 2003 during the Dijon Congress with the support of the main Socialist personalities, against the left wing of the party. In the 2004 regional elections, the Socialists had a major comeback. In coalition with the former "Plural Left", they gained power in 20 of the 22 metropolitan regions (all except Alsace and Corsica) and in the four overseas regions. The party benefited from increasing frustration with right-wing parties. However, the Socialist Party has experienced considerable difficulty in formulating an alternative to right-wing policy.

On 1 December 2004, 59% of Socialist Party members approved the proposed European Constitution. However, several well-known members of the Party, including Laurent Fabius, and left-wingers Henri Emmanuelli and Jean-Luc Mélenchon, asked the public for a "no" vote in the 29 May 2005 French referendum on the European Constitution, where the proposed Constitution was rejected. Fabius was ejected from the executive office of the party. The split over the European Constitution, as well as party leaders' competing ambitions to win the presidential nomination in 2007, led the party into considerable disarray.

In November 2005, during the Le Mans Congress, three main groups were present. The majority supported a moderate text and obtained 55%. Fabius's allies ("To Rally the Left") advocated more radical policies and gained 20%. Finally, another faction ("New Socialist Party") claimed it was necessary to renovate the party by proposing left-wing policies and a profound reform of French institutions. It obtained 25% of the vote. Virtually all factions agreed on a common agenda, broadly based on the moderate and pro-European majority's position with some left-wing amendments.

2007 presidential election and its aftermath 

Many potential candidates appeared for the 2007 presidential election: François Hollande, Laurent Fabius (from the left wing of the party), Dominique Strauss-Kahn (who claimed to represent "social democracy"), Jack Lang, Martine Aubry and Ségolène Royal, who was favoured according to the polls. Some Socialist leaders asked Jospin to return. He declared he was "available" then finally refused.

On 16 November 2006, the members of the Socialist Party chose Ségolène Royal to be their candidate with a majority of 60%. Her challengers, Strauss-Kahn and Fabius, obtained 21% and 19% respectively.

After obtaining 25.87% of the vote in the first round of France's presidential elections, Royal qualified for the second round of voting but lost with 46.94% to Nicolas Sarkozy on 6 May 2007. Immediately after her defeat several party bosses (notably Strauss-Kahn), held Ségolène Royal personally responsible for the unsuccessful campaign. At the same time, some personalities of the right wing of the party (such as Bernard Kouchner) accepted to join the government nominated by Nicolas Sarkozy.

In the 10 and 17 June 2007 National Assembly elections, the Socialist Party won 186 out of 577 seats, and about 10 affiliated, gain of 40 seats.

After the winning March 2008 municipal election, the campaign with a view to the Reims Congress started. Some candidates proposed to succeed François Hollande, who had announced he will not compete for another term as First Secretary:
 Ségolène Royal who wished to forge an alliance with the centrist party MoDem;
 the Mayor of Paris Bertrand Delanoë, supported by Lionel Jospin and his friends, who wished to keep the status quo of the 2007 campaign and come back to the Plural Left;
 Martine Aubry, supported by the followers of Laurent Fabius and Dominique Strauss-Kahn, who had the same electoral strategy as the Mayor of Paris but advocated reconciliation between the campaigners of the "yes" and the "no" to the European constitution; and
 the young left-winger Benoît Hamon.

In the pre-vote, the text of Royal arrived the first with 29%, followed by Delanoë (25%), Aubry (25%) and Hamon (19%). A part of the left wing split and founded the Left Party. During the Reims Congress, which happened in a very tense climate, the leaders of the factions failed to form a majority. Consequently, the PS members had to elect directly the next First Secretary. Disappointed by his result in the pre-vote, Delanoë renounced and called to vote for Aubry.

On 22 November 2008 it was announced that Aubry had defeated Royal by the narrow margin of 42 votes, and Royal asked for a recount. After checking, Martine Aubry was elected by a margin of 102 votes and 50.03% of votes. Denouncing frauds, Royal's team threatened to lodge a complaint before to renounce.

After that, the public image of the party was deteriorated. In the 2009 European Parliament election, the PS did not succeed to benefit from the unpopularity of President Sarkozy. It obtained only 16.5% of the vote and only just got ahead of Europe Ecology (16.3%). However, the PS strengthened its network of local elects in winning comfortably the 2010 departmental and regional elections. In September 2011, for the first time a Socialist, Jean-Pierre Bel, was elected Chairman of the Senate of France.

2012 presidential election 

Candidates for the presidency of France contested an open primary on 9 October 2011 to select the Socialist Party candidate for the 2012 presidential election. The nominations for the candidacy were opened on 28 June. Though he had not officially declared his candidacy, Dominique Strauss-Kahn, a prominent member of the Socialist Party and the managing director of the International Monetary Fund was the polls' clear favorite to defeat the incumbent conservative president, Nicolas Sarkozy. But he faced a sex assault complaint in New York and was de facto eliminated from the primary.

Eventually, former party leader François Hollande won the primary and ran as the official Socialist Party candidate for President of France. He narrowly defeated incumbent Nicolas Sarkozy, becoming president-elect of France on Sunday 6 May 2012.

The idea for holding an open primary to choose the Socialist Party presidential candidate had first been suggested in 2008, by the independent left-leaning think tank Terra Nova.

2017 presidential election 

The Socialist Party decided to hold a presidential primary in 2017, against the backdrop of the unprecedented unpopularity of incumbent François Hollande, with a 4 percent approval rating, who announced on 1 December 2016 that he would not seek re-election, making him the first president of the Fifth Republic not to seek a second term. It was also set against the fragmentation of the left between three major candidates, with polls indicating that the party's candidate would come in fifth, behind the National Front's Marine Le Pen, François Fillon of the centre-right Republicans, Emmanuel Macron, former economy minister under Hollande who founded his centrist political movement, En Marche!, and left-wing ex-Socialist Jean-Luc Mélenchon under the banner of La France insoumise. The primary was won by Socialist rebel Benoît Hamon, who defeated ex-Prime Minister Manuel Valls in the second round of the primary on 29 January 2017. Hamon finished 5th in the subsequent Presidential election, with 6.36% of the vote. In the 2017 legislative election that followed the election of President Emmanuel Macron, the Socialist party dropped from 280 to 30 seats in the National Assembly, leaving it in 4th place in terms of seats, and with 7.44% of the 1st round vote. The Parliamentary left group that it dominated (with 30 out of 45 seats after the election, down from 280 out of 331 seats before) finished as the 3rd largest group in the National Assembly. Following the election, Cambadélis resigned from the post of first secretary and Rachid Temal was appointed as acting secretary. The Socialist group was ultimately refounded as the New Left (NG).

On 1 July 2017 Hamon left the Socialist Party and founded the 1st July Movement (later renamed Génération.s). The Socialist Party abstained from the confidence vote on the Second Philippe government. The party later elected 78 senators in the 2017 election.

On 7–8 April 2018 the Aubervilliers Congress elected Olivier Faure as new first secretary of the party; Faure announced the party would be in opposition to Macron and Philippe. Because of financial problems, the party was forced to sell its historical seat in Rue de Solférino and moved into a smaller one in Rue Molière, on Ivry-sur-Seine.

Following the Benalla affair, the Socialist Party entered a motion of no confidence against the government, together with the French Communist Party and La France Insoumise. The motions obtained 63 ayes and failed to reach the quorum of 289 votes required in the National Assembly.

In 2018, the New Left group changed its name into Socialists and affiliated group.

On 12 October 2018, MEP Emmanuel Maurel left the party together with other elected officials and founded the Alternative for a republican, ecologist and socialist program (APRÉS).

For the 2019 European election, the Socialist Party formed a joint list with the Radical Party of the Left, Place Publique and New Deal, with Raphaël Glucksmann at its head. The list scored 6.19% of votes and elected three MEPs.

2022 presidential election 
In the first round of voting in the 2022 French presidential election, the candidate Anne Hidalgo obtained the worst presidential election result in the party's history, with 1.75% of the total vote.

2022 legislative elections 
In advance of the 2022 French legislative election, the party entered into a left-wing alliance, the New Ecologic and Social People's Union (NUPES), joining Europe Ecology – The Greens, the French Communist Party, La France Insoumise and other minor left-wing parties. Some Socialists like Sylvie Tolmont, disillusioned with the alliance, stood in the election as dissident candidates. The Socialist Party was able to win 27 seats , becoming the second left-wing force in the National Assembly, after La France Insoumise.

First secretaries 
 Alain Savary (1969–1971)
 François Mitterrand (1971–1981)
 Lionel Jospin (1981–1988)
 Pierre Mauroy (1988–1992)
 Laurent Fabius (1992–1993)
 Michel Rocard (1993–1994)
 Henri Emmanuelli (1994–1995)
 Lionel Jospin (1995–1997)
 François Hollande (1997–2008)
 Martine Aubry (2008–2012)
 Harlem Désir (appointed on 30 June 2011, acting during Martine Aubry's candidacy in the 2011 French Socialist Party presidential primary; 2012–2014)
 Jean-Christophe Cambadélis (2014–2017)
 Rachid Temal (2017–2018; acting)
 Olivier Faure (2018–present)

Factions 
Factions are organised in the Socialist Party through policy declarations called motions on which the party members vote at each party congress: 
 Royalists (moderate social democracy): Ségolène Royal, Gérard Collomb, Jean-Noël Guérini, Gaëtan Gorce, Jean-Louis Bianco, Julien Dray, Vincent Peillon, Aurélie Filippetti, Hélène Mandroux, Jean-Jack Queyranne, François Rebsamen and Manuel Valls
 Aubryists (Christian left, social democracy): Martine Aubry, François Lamy, Sandrine Mazetier, Pierre Mauroy, Paulette Guinchard-Kunstler, Adeline Hazan and Arnaud Montebourg (Renovate Now)
 Fabiusians (progressivism): Laurent Fabius, Claude Bartolone, Marylise Lebranchu, Alain Le Vern, Alain Vidalies and Marie-Noëlle Lienemann
 Delanoistes (social liberalism): Bertrand Delanoë, François Hollande, Jean-Marc Ayrault, Lionel Jospin, Michel Rocard, Jean-Yves Le Drian, Élisabeth Guigou, Michel Sapin, Alain Rousset, Harlem Désir, Pierre Cohen, Michel Destot and Roland Ries
 New Socialist Party (democratic socialism): Henri Emmanuelli, Benoît Hamon, Jacques Fleury, Michel Vergnier, André Lejeune and Paul Quilès
 Eco-socialists (eco-socialism and ): Christophe Caresche, Jean-Louis Tourenne, Nicole Bricq, Geneviève Gaillard and Philippe Tourtelier

Election results

Presidency

National Assembly

European Parliament

Splinter parties 
 1956–: Guianese Socialist Party, splinter from the French Section of the Workers' International (SFIO), the predecessor of the Socialist Party.
 1970–1973: Party of Socialist Democracy (PDS) (fr), led by the deputy Émile Muller.
 1972–: Guadeloupean Socialist Party (PSG), founded by the former senator René Toribio.
 1973: Socialist Democratic Movement of France (MDSF), led by the deputy Max Lejeune (fr)
 1973–1995: fusion of PDS, MDSF and other splinter groups (Liberal Socialist Movement, Democratic Socialism, Socialism for Liberties and Democracy) to form the Socialist Democratic Movement of France (MDS), renamed after the March 1973 legislative election Social Democratic Party (PSD), joined the centre-right Union for French Democracy (UDF) in 1978.
 1986–: Alsatian Democracy Movement (MDA) (fr), founded by Alfred Muller, elected in 1993 as deputy with the endorsement of the PS.
 1990–: Martinican Socialist Party (PMS), founded by Maurice Louis-Joseph-Dogué (fr).
 1993–2002: Movement of Citizens (MDC), founded by the deputy Jean-Pierre Chevènement, renamed the Citizen and Republican Movement (MRC) in 2003
 1994–: United Guadeloupe, Socialism and Realities, formerly (1991-1994) the Reflexion and Action Group for Guadeloupe (GRAP-G) faction inside the Guadeloupe federation of the Socialist Party
 1996–: Social Democratic Corsica (CSD) (fr), founded by Simon Renucci.
 2007–: Modern Left (LGM), founded by the senator Jean-Marie Bockel, joined the centre-right Union of Democrats and Independents (UDI) in 2012
 2008–: Left Party (PG), founded by senator Jean-Luc Mélenchon, joined the Left Front in 2009.
 2013–: New Deal (ND).
 2015–: Les Socialistes insoumis (fr), led by former MEP Liêm Hoang Ngoc.
 2017–: Génération.s, le mouvement (fr), led by former presidential candidate Benoît Hamon
 2018–: Republican and Socialist Left, led by Emmanuel Maurel and Marie-Noëlle Lienemann

See also 

 French Section of the Workers' International
 New Left group
 Socialist and Republican group
 Terra Nova (think tank)
 Workers and Peasants Socialist Party
 Pasokification

References

Further reading 
 
 Bell, David S., and Byron Criddle. Exceptional Socialists: The Case of the French Socialist Party (2014).
 Bell, David Scott, and Byron Criddle. The French Socialist Party: The emergence of a party of government (1988).
 Bell, David. François Mitterrand: a political biography (2005).
 Cole, Alistair. "The French Socialist Party and Its Radical Ambiguity." French Politics, Culture & Society (2011) 29#3 pp: 29–48.
 Cole, A., S. Meunier, and V. Tiberj. "From Sarkozy to Hollande: The New Normal?" in Developments in French Politics 5 (Palgrave Macmillan, 2013), edited by A. Cole, S. Meunier, and V. Tiberj, pp 1–18.
 Cole, Alistair. François Mitterrand: A study in political leadership (1994).
 Cole, Alistair M. "Factionalism, the French socialist party and the fifth Republic: An explanation of intra‐party divisions." European Journal of Political Research (1989) 17#1 pp: 77-94.
 Colton, Joel. Léon Blum: humanist in politics (1987).
 Criddle, Byron. Socialists and European integration: a study of the French Socialist Party (1969).
 Graham, Bruce Desmond. Choice and democratic order: the French Socialist Party, 1937-1950 (2006).
 Greene, Nathanael. Crisis and decline: The French socialist party in the popular front era (1969).
 
 Noland, Aaron. The Founding of the French Socialist Party (1893-1905) (1956).
 Northcutt, Wayne. Mitterrand: A political biography (1992).
 Northcutt, Wayne. "François Mitterrand and the political use of symbols: the construction of a centrist republic." French Historical Studies (1991) pp: 141–158. 
 
 
 Short, Philip. Mitterrand: A Study in Ambiguity (2013).
 Wall, Irwin. France Votes: The Election of François Hollande (Palgrave Macmillan, 2014).

External links 
  

 
Social democratic parties
Social democratic parties in Europe
Centre-left parties in Europe
Full member parties of the Socialist International